Mikra is an under-construction metro station serving Thessaloniki Metro's Line 2. It will serve as the eastern terminus of the line and is expected to enter service in 2023.

References

See also
List of Thessaloniki Metro stations

Thessaloniki Metro